Carlo Mazza (1704-1777) was an Italian painter.

Biography
He was born in Correggio, but mainly active in Bologna. He trained under Girolamo Donnini. He painted in the chapel of Santissimi Sacramento in San Petronio of Bologna. In the church of the Servi, he painted a Santi Simone e Giuda. He painted a Saints Anne, Charles, and Louis for the church of San Bartolomeo in Porta Ravegnana. He painted a Santo Uomobono for the church of Sant'Eligio. He died in Bologna. He may be related to the sculptor Giuseppe Maria Mazza.

References

1704 births
1777 deaths
Painters from Bologna
18th-century Italian painters
Italian male painters
Italian Baroque painters
18th-century Italian male artists